The 2020 WTA Finals, also known by its sponsored name Shiseido WTA Finals Shenzhen, was a women's tennis tournament that was scheduled to be held in Shenzhen, China. It would have been the 50th edition of the singles event and the 45th edition of the doubles competition, contested by eight singles players and eight doubles teams.

However, the tournament was cancelled by the WTA, due to the COVID-19 pandemic, on 24 July 2020.

Tournament
The 2020 WTA Finals was scheduled to take place at the Shenzhen Bay Sports Center the week of October 26, 2020. It would have been the 50th edition of the event. The tournament would have been run by the Women's Tennis Association (WTA) as part of the 2020 WTA Tour. Shenzhen would have been the tenth city to host the WTA Finals since the tournament's inauguration in 1972.

Qualifying
In the singles, point totals are calculated by combining point totals from sixteen tournaments. Of these sixteen tournaments, a player's results from the four Grand Slam events, the four Premier Mandatory tournaments, and (for the top 20 players at the end of 2019) the best results from two Premier 5 tournaments must be included.
In the doubles, point totals are calculated by any combination of eleven tournaments throughout the year. Unlike in the singles, this combination does not need to include results from the Grand-Slam or Premier-level tournaments.

Format
Both the singles and doubles event features eight players/teams in a round robin event, split into two groups of four. Over the first four days of competition, each player/team meets the other three players/teams in her group, with the top two in each group advancing to the semifinals. The first-placed player/team in one group meets the second-placed player/team in the other group, and vice versa. The winners of each semifinal meet in the championship match.

Round robin tie-breaking methods
The final standings are made using these methods:

 Greatest number of [match] wins.
 Greatest number of matches played.
 Head-to-head results if only two players are tied, or if three players are tied then:

a. If three players each have the same number of wins, a player having played less than all three matches is automatically eliminated and the player advancing to the single elimination competition is the winner of the match-up of the two remaining tied players.
b. Highest percentage of sets won.
c. Highest percentage of games won.

Prize money and points
The total prize money for the BNP Paribas WTA Finals 2019 is US$14,000,000.
The tables below are based on the updated draw sheet information.

Porsche Race to Shenzhen
On 16 March 2020, the WTA rankings were frozen due to the COVID-19 pandemic. As a result of the pandemic, the Race to Shenzhen has been cancelled and the promotion is no longer valid. The WTA rankings would be used for the singles qualification.

Below is the unofficial WTA Singles Race ranking for only 2020 events.

Players in gold (*) would have qualified for the WTA Finals.

Below is the unofficial WTA Doubles Race ranking for only 2020 events.

Players in gold (*) would have qualified for the WTA Finals.

See also
2020 WTA Elite Trophy
2020 WTA Tour
2020 ATP Finals

References

External links

2020 in Chinese tennis
Finals
2020 WTA Finals
2020 WTA Finals
2020
Sport in Shenzhen
WTA